Joint Entrance Examination – Advanced (JEE-Advanced) (formerly the Indian Institute of Technology - Joint Entrance Examination (IIT-JEE)), is an academic examination held annually in India. It is organised by one of the seven zonal IITs (IIT Roorkee, IIT Kharagpur, IIT Delhi, IIT Kanpur, IIT Bombay, IIT Madras, and IIT Guwahati) under the guidance of the Joint Admission Board (JAB) on a round-robin rotation pattern for the qualifying candidates of the JEE-Main (exempted for Foreign Candidates). It was used to be the sole prerequisite for admission to the Indian Institutes of Technology bachelor's programs before the introduction of UCEED, Online B.S. and Olympiad entries, but seats through these new mediums are very low (except IITM Online B.S. which has open enrolment).

Other universities—such as the Marine Engineering and Research Institute, Indian Institute of Petroleum and Energy (IIPE), the Rajiv Gandhi Institute of Petroleum Technology, the Indian Institute of Space Technology (IIST), the Indian Institute of Science Education and Research (IISERs), and the Indian Institute of Science (IISc) — use the score obtained on the JEE-Advanced exam as the basis for admission. The JEE-Advanced score is also used as a possible basis for admission by Indian applicants to non-Indian universities such as the University of Cambridge and National University of Singapore.

It has been consistently ranked as one of the toughest exams in the world.   High school students from across the country prepare for several years to take this exam, and most of these students have attended coaching institutes. The difficulty and low acceptance rate puts extreme pressure on students taking the exam. In an interview in 2018, former IIT Delhi director  V. Ramgopal Rao, famously said that the exam is "tricky and difficult" because it is framed to "reject candidates, not to select them". In 2022, out of the 155,538 candidates who took the exam, 40,712 candidates qualified (34,196 males and 6516 females).

History

The first institute among IITs, Indian Institute of Technology Kharagpur, started in 1951. In its initial years before 1961, students were admitted based on their academic results, followed by an interview in several locations across the country. From 1955 to 1960, admissions for the Indian Institute of Technology Kharagpur were conducted via a national examination. Academic disciplines were allotted to the students via interviews and counselling sessions held at Kharagpur.

The IIT-JEE was first conducted in 1961, coinciding with the 1961 IIT Act.

In 1978, the English paper was not considered when ranking participants' performance in the examination. In 1998, the English test was discontinued.

In 1997, the IIT-JEE was conducted twice after the question paper was leaked in some locations.

Between 2000 and 2005, an additional screening test was used alongside the main examination, intended to reduce pressure on the main examination by allowing only about 20,000 top candidates to appear for the examination, out of more than 450,000 applicants.

In 2002, an additional exam called the AIEEE was introduced, and it was used for admissions to many institutions of national importance other than the IITs.

In June 2005, The Hindu newspaper led a campaign for reforming the IIT-JEE to eradicate the "coaching mania" and to improve gender and socio-economic diversity. Two possible solutions were proposed - either a convergence between the screening test and the All India Engineering Entrance Examination (AIEEE), or a two-tier examination. Whereas ranks from the first tier can be used to gain admission to the NITs and other engineering colleges in the country.

In September 2005, the group of directors of all the IITs announced significant revisions to the examination. These were implemented from 2006 onward. The revised examination consisted of a single objective test, replacing and abolishing the earlier two-test system with screener. In the revised examination, to be eligible for taking it, candidates in the general category had to obtain at least 60% aggregate marks in the 12th-grade examinations organized by various educational boards of India, while candidates belonging to Scheduled Castes (SC), Scheduled Tribes (ST), and Persons With Disabilities (PwD) categories needed a minimum score of 55%.

In 2008, the director and the dean of IIT Madras proposed further revisions to the examination, arguing that the coaching institutes were "enabling many among the less-than-best students to crack the test and keeping girls from qualifying". They expressed concern that the present system did not allow for applicants' 12 years of schooling to have a bearing on admissions into IIT.

In 2008, the Indian Institutes of Technology began offering their admission tests in Dubai. Annually, the number of candidates for the examination in Dubai varies between 200 and 220.

In 2013, the AIEEE was renamed JEE (Main), and IIT-JEE was renamed JEE (Advanced); the JEE (Main) had become the screening exam for JEE (Advanced).

The two-tier reform suggested in 2005 may become a reality as the Indian government has announced plans for a single entrance exam for all engineering colleges from 2018, with students aspiring for the IITs having to pass the nationwide standardized engineering entrance exam JEE (Main) with high marks, and then take the JEE (Advanced) to qualify for the IITs. In 2018, the JEE (Advanced) exam started being conducted online.

Eligibility 
The eligibility criteria for taking the JEE (Advanced) exam are as follows:
 Candidates should rank among the top 250,000 candidates in Paper-1 of JEE (Main), broken down per category. For example, for JEE (Advanced) 2019, the top 250,000 were eligible, but only 46.5% of those were open for all, the rest being reserved for special categories: 10% for General-Economically Weaker Sections, 27% for OBC - Non Creamy Layer, 15% for SC, 7.5% for ST, and the remaining 40.5% OPEN for all.
 Candidates should be less than 25 years of age, with five-year relaxation for SC, ST, and PwD candidates.
 Candidates can attempt the examination at most two times in two consecutive years.
 Candidates should have qualified the Class XII Board Examination (or equivalent) in the same or the previous year. (For Example, For JEE-2023, students must have passed Class XII board (or equivalent) in 2023 or 2022.
 Candidates should not have accepted admission in any of the IITs earlier.

In addition, candidates are required to either be within the category-wise top 20th percentile of successful candidates in the Class XII Board Examination or secure a 75% mark (65% for SC (scheduled castes), ST (scheduled tribes), and PwD (people with disabilities). Foreign Candidates are exempted from the requirement of JEE (Main).

Qualifying Percentage 
Minimum percentage of marks prescribed for inclusion in the rank list

Minimum percentage of aggregate/subject marks may be lowered subsequently considering the toughness of the paper and the need of students.

For example: Minimum percentage of marks prescribed for inclusion in the rank list in 2022

Number of applicants by year

Organizing institute 
This list shows the organizers of the JEE (Advanced) in recent years.

Paper Pattern
JEE(Advanced) is conducted in two shifts of three hours each - Paper-1 and Paper-2, both the papers consist questions from three major subjects- Physics, Chemistry and Mathematics. Unlike most of the other exams, the type of questions being asked in the paper varies from year to year, with an average of about 36-38 questions asked from each subject across both the shifts, For example, the 2021 JEE Advanced paper had 38 questions (19 questions in Paper-1 and the next 19 in Paper-2) from each of the three subjects, every subject had questions divided into 4 main sections- 

1. Section 1 consisted of 4 Single correct-multiple choice questions with marking scheme of +4 for every correct answer, 0 if question is left unanswered and -1 for every wrong answer.

2. Section 2 consisted of Three question stems with 2 questions per stem, each of which had a numerical answer with two decimal places. Marking scheme for the questions was +2 for every correct answer and 0 in all other cases.

3. Section 3 consisted of 6 Multi correct- multiple choice questions, where one or more than one options for each question were correct. It had a marking scheme of  +4 If only (all) the correct option(s) is(are) chosen; +3 If all the four options are correct but only three options are chosen; +2 If three or more options are correct but only two options are chosen, both of which are correct; +1  If two or more options are correct but only one option is chosen and it is a correct option; 0 If unanswered; while a −2  was given for every wrong one chosen.

4. Section 4 consisted of 3 questions whose answers where ‘non-negative integers’, every question carried a +4 for correct integer filled and 0 for all the other cases.

Some previous year papers also included matrix match type questions instead of Single Correct - multiple choice questions.

Syllabus
Since the starting of the examination in 1961, the syllabus majorly consists of topics that are taught in Indian High schools, from the curriculum of Class XI and Class XII. These include topics from Mathematics, Physics and Chemistry (Organic Chemistry, Inorganic Chemistry and Physical Chemistry). A recent change in the syllabus was carried out in November 2021, when a revised syllabus was adopted for the exam, this syllabus is to be implemented from 2023 onwards. A brief overview of topics asked is listed below.

1. Mathematics : Higher Algebra (including certain topics from Linear Algebra), Combinatorics, Probability, Geometry, Coordinate system
(Point and Lines, Circles, Parabolas, Ellipse and Hyperbola), Trigonometry (including the Inverse trigonometric functions), Calculus (Both Differential calculus and Integral calculus) and Complex Numbers.

2. Physics : General Physics, Classical Newtonian Mechanics, Fluid Mechanics, Thermodynamics, Acoustics ( Sound and Oscillation), Electromagnetism, Electrostatics, Electrodynamics, (Both Electricity and Magnetism) and Electromagnetic Waves, Modern physics ( Radioactivity, Nuclear physics, Elementary Quantum mechanics), Optics ( Both Geometrical optics and Wave optics)

3. Chemistry:

I. Physical Chemistry : General Studies of Substance ( Moles, Molarity, Redox Reactions, etc), Atomic structure (with concerned topics of Quantum Mechanics), States of matter, Chemical Thermodynamics and Chemical Kinetics, Equilibrium chemistry  (Both  Chemical equilibrium and Ionic equilibrium), Electrochemistry, Colligative Properties , Titrations (including Acid-Base and Redox) Surface science and  Nuclear Chemistry.

II. Inorganic Chemistry: Periodic properties,  Bonding in chemicals (including the Theories of Bonding ie. Valence bond theory, VSEPR Theory and Molecular orbital theory),  Coordination compounds and Complexes, Metallurgy,  Qualitative Inorganic Salt Analysis, Hydrogen, Detailed studies of Reactions, Physical and Chemical properties, along with their certain compounds of Alkali metals, Alkaline earth metals, Boron family, Carbon family, Nitrogen family, Oxygen family, Halogens and Noble gases, Transition elements (including  Noble metals), Actinides, Lanthanides,  Types of Reactions  and Environmental chemistry. 

III. Organic Chemistry: IUPAC nomenclature General organic chemistry ( including Hybridisation, Hydrogen bonding, Inductive effects, Isomerism, Resonance, Aromaticity, Hyperconjugation, Mesomerism, Carbocations and Carbanions, Free radical, Bond cleavage including Heterolysis and Homolysis, Stereoisomerism including enantiomers and diastereomers) ,  Organic Reagents,  Some Named Reactions, Detailed analysis of reaction mechanisms, the compounds and preparation of Hydrocarbons, Alkyl Halides, Carbonyl compounds 
(Alcohols, Phenols and Ethers),  Aromatic Compounds, Biomolecules, Carbohydrates and Polymers,  Amines, Chemistry in everyday life and Practical Organic Chemistry.

Seats

The number of students taking the examination increased substantially each year with 506,484 candidates registered for JEE (Advanced) 2012. However, with the two stage JEE (Main) + JEE (Advanced) structure from 2013, the number of candidates in JEE (Advanced) is fixed at 1.5 lakh students in 2013 and it is increased in subsequent years to 2.5 lakhs as of 2022. The total seats available in each institute (Seat Matrix) is summarized in table below, year wise.

Note: This intake is only about bachelor's program intake through JEE Advanced and it is not about intake in IITs, because some IITs also admit students through UCEED, Olympiads.

In 2011, additional courses were introduced in the IITs. IIT Tirupati and IIT Palakkad were started in 2015 and four more institutes (IIT Bhilai, IIT Dharwad, IIT Goa, and IIT Jammu) opened in 2016. In 2018, to ensure minimum female enrollment of 14%, the IITs introduced "female-only" and "gender-neutral" seats based on 2017 enrollment statistics; and "super-numerary" seats were allocated per-institute and per-course to reach a 14% target. With these, and slight overall seat increases, the total seat availability was over 12,000, including 801 "super-numerary female-only" seats. For 2019, with the partial rollout of a 10% EWS quota (without a reduction in non-reserved seats) and the increase of the female enrollment target to 17%, the total seats available went up to over 13,500, with over 1200 super-numerary female-only seats. In 2020, with the full rollout of the 10% EWS quota and a 20% female enrolment target, total available seats increased further to 16,053, with over 1500 super-numerary female-only seats.

Criticism
In 2012, Super 30 founder and mathematician Anand Kumar criticized the New Admission Norms, saying that the decision of the IITs' council to give a chance to students in the top 20% from various boards in the class 12 examinations was "a decision in haste". "This is one decision that will go against the poor, who don't have the opportunity to study in elite schools," he added.

The IIT-JEE is conducted only in English and Hindi; it has been criticized as being harder for students from places where other Indian languages, like Tamil, Telugu, Kannada, Malayalam, Urdu, Oriya, Bengali, Marathi, Assamese, or Gujarati, are more prominent. In September 2011, the Gujarat High Court acted on a Public Interest Litigation by the Gujarati Sahitya Parishad, demanding the examinations be conducted in Gujarati also. A second petition was made that October by Navsari's Sayaji Vaibhav Sarvajanik Pustakalaya Trust. Another petition was made at the Madras High Court for conducting the exam in Tamil. In the petition, it was claimed that not conducting the exam in the regional languages violates article 14 of the Constitution of India. The Pattali Makkal Katchi (PMK) party, a political party in Tamil Nadu, held a demonstration at Chennai for conducting the IIT-JEE and other national entrance exams in regional languages also, particularly Tamil in Tamil Nadu.

The PMK party filed Public Interest Litigation in the Madras High Court to conduct the IIT-JEE entrance exam in Tamil. They claimed that every year 763,000 students were completing grade 12 in Tamil Nadu, 75% of them from Tamil Medium. They had to take the entrance exam in English or Hindi, neither of which was their medium of instruction nor their mother tongue, and so were denied their fundamental right to take the entrance exam in a language familiar to them. Shiv Sena urged the MHRD to conduct the IIT-JEE and other national undergraduate entrance exams in regional languages, particularly Marathi in Maharashtra. In 2017, the Supreme Court ordered JAB to put a bar on the ongoing counseling process. There were three questions comprising a total of 11 marks that were unclear.

Changes made in JEE (Advanced) in 2018
There were several changes made to the exam in 2018. The Joint Admission Board (JAB) decided to conduct the entire exam online from 2018 onwards, hoping to reduce the chances of paper leak and make logistics and evaluation easier. It said that the online exam would neutralize the problem of misprinting.

Coaching

Preparation for the Joint Entrance Exam begins typically two to four years before students take the test. More than 90% of students who passed this exam attended coaching institutes, which had created a ₹232.61 billion industry with annual tuition of up to ₹250,000. These academies included mock tests multiple times a week, up to 200 students per class, and long hours, ranging from 4 to 7 hours a day, in addition to regular high school work. There were hundreds of academies across the country, and the most famous—in Kota, Rajasthan—attracted approximately 125,000 students each year. 

Coaching programs are major corporations, listed on the Indian stock market and also attracting billions of dollars of investment from private equity firms. The high-pressure environment at these coaching institutes have been blamed for a significant number of suicides.

Recent schedule revisions
The former HRD minister of India, Ramesh Pokhriyal confirmed the dates and the nature of conduct for the JEE Main and Advanced examinations for the academic year 2021. The JEE-Main exam was slated to be conducted in eight sessions over four days— two sessions each day— for each phase, with a total of four phases being held in four different months. The first phase was organized from the 23 to 28 February, while the other phases were scheduled to be organized in the subsequent months of March, April and May. The JEE-Advanced exam was scheduled to be held on 3 July 2021 but was postponed— together with the third and fourth phases of the JEE-Main examination that were to be held in the respective months of April and May— due to the COVID-19 pandemic. The third and fourth phases of the JEE-Main examinations were later held on 20 July - 3 August and 26 August – 2 September, respectively. The JEE-Advanced exam was held on 3 October 2021.

JEE-Advanced 2022 was scheduled to be held on 3 July 2022 in the usual two sessions - Morning and Afternoon (both compulsory). However, with 2022 JEE-Main being postponed from April / May to 20–29 June / 21–30 July, JEE-Advanced 2022 was also postponed and subsequently held on 28 August 2022.

See also
 Graduate Aptitude Test in Engineering
 Indian Science Engineering Eligibility Test
 Joint Management Entrance Test
 Joint Entrance Examination – Main
 Joint Seat Allocation Authority
 List of Public service commissions in India

References 

Engineering entrance examinations in India
Indian Institutes of Technology
Standardized tests for Engineering
Entrance examinations
Standardised tests in India
2012 establishments in Odisha